The Örebro Läns Fotbollförbund (Örebro County Football Association) is one of the 24 district organisations of the Swedish Football Association. It administers lower tier football in Örebro County.

Background 

Örebro Läns Fotbollförbund, commonly referred to as Örebro Läns FF, was founded in 1938 and is the governing body for football in the county of Örebro. The Association currently has 92 member clubs.  Based in Örebro, the Association's Chairman is Raul Björk.

Affiliated Members 

The following clubs are affiliated to the Örebro Läns FF:

Adolfsbergs IK
Axbergs IF
BK Forward
BK Forward/Eyra
Bobby BK
Brickebackens IF
Dalkarlsbergs IF
Ekeby IF
Ervalla FF
Ervalla SK
FC Assyriska
FC Höftskott
FC Irakiska
Fellingsbro GOIF
Finnerödja IF
Fjugesta IF
FK Bosna 92 Örebro
FK Örebro
Frövi IK
Garphyttans IF
Glanshammar Fotbolls Förening
Glanshammars IF
Grönbo IF
Grythyttans IF
Guldsmedsh.-Stråssa BK
Hagaberg Futsal Club
Hällefors AIF
Hallsbergs BK
Hampetorp-Odensbackens IF
Hidingsta IK
Hjortkvarns IF
Hovsta IF
IF Eker Örebro
IFK Askersund
IFK Hallsberg FK
IFK Kumla
IFK Lindesberg
IFK Örebro
IK Sturehov
Integrations IF
Järnboås IF
Karlslunds FF
Karlslunds IF HFK
KIF Örebro DFF
KIF Örebro DUFF
Kilsmo IK
Kopparberg BK
Kumla BK
Latorps IF
Laxå IF
Lekebergs IF
Lilla Örebro BK
Lillån FK
Lillkyrka IF
Lindesbergs FK
Mariebergs IK
Mosjö SK
Mullhyttans IF
Närkesberg/Mariedamm FF
Nerikes Kils SK
Nora IK
Nora-Pershyttan BK
Nyckelby IF
Pålsboda GOIF
Pars FC Örebro
Real Örebro FF
Riksidrottsgymnasiet Örebro Futsal Club
Röfors IF
Rynninge IK
Sannaheds IF
Simon SK
Sköllersta IF
Skyllbergs IK
Sportakademin Cantolao FK
SS Kumla
Ställdalens AIK
Stene IF
Stora Mellösa-Åsbyvikens IF
Svartå IF
Vivalla Star IF
Vretstorps IF
Wedevågs IF
Yxhults IK
Zinkgruvans IF
Åmmebergs IF
Öfvre Adolfsberg FC
Örebro SK FK
Örebro SK Söder
Örebro SK Ungdomsklubb
Örebro Syrianska IF
ÖSK Elitfotboll AB
Östansjö IF
Östra Almby FK

League Competitions 
Örebro Läns FF run the following League Competitions:

Men's Football
Division 4  -  one section
Division 5  -  two sections
Division 6  -  two sections
Division 7  -  three sections
Division 8  -  four sections

Women's Football
Division 3  -  one section
Division 4  -  one section

Footnotes

External links 
 Örebro Läns FF Official Website 

Örebro
Football in Örebro County